Whey protein is a mixture of proteins isolated from whey, the liquid material created as a by-product of cheese production. The proteins consist of α-lactalbumin, β-lactoglobulin, serum albumin and immunoglobulins. Glycomacropeptide also makes up the third largest component but is not a protein. Whey protein is commonly marketed as a protein supplement, and various health claims have been attributed to it. A review published in 2010 in the European Food Safety Authority Journal concluded that the provided literature did not adequately support the proposed claims. For muscle growth, whey protein has been shown to be slightly better compared to other types of protein, such as casein or soy.

Production of whey 

Whey is left over when milk is coagulated during the process of cheese production, and contains everything that is soluble from milk after the pH is dropped to 4.6 during the coagulation process. It is a 5% solution of lactose in water and contains the water soluble proteins of milk as well as some lipid content. Processing can be done by simple drying, or the relative protein content can be increased by removing the lactose, lipids and other non-protein materials. For example, membrane filtration separates the proteins from lipids, lactose and minerals in whey, which is followed by spray drying.

Whey can be denatured by heat. High heat (such as the sustained high temperatures above 72 °C associated with the pasteurization process) denatures whey proteins. While native whey protein does not aggregate upon renneting or acidification of milk, denaturing the whey protein triggers hydrophobic interactions with other proteins, and the formation of a protein gel.

Microbial Whey Protein Production 

Microbes have been engineered to produce proteins similar or even "bioidentical" to whey. Companies innovating microbe produced whey and cheese include Perfect Day, California Performance, New Culture, and Motif Ingredients. None of these companies stipulate the protein composition of their products, but they do contain some of the genes needed to make whey proteins. These products are thought to be viewed as similar to current GMO derived food products.

Composition

The protein in cow's milk is approximately 20% whey and 80% casein. The protein in human milk is approximately 60% whey and 40% casein. The protein fraction in whey constitutes approximately 10% of the total dry solids in whey. This protein is typically a mixture of beta-lactoglobulin (~65%), alpha-lactalbumin (~25%), bovine serum albumin (~8%) (see also serum albumin), and immunoglobulins. The third largest fragment of whey protein isolate derived from sweet whey is glycomacropeptide or GMP. However, GMP lacks the secondary structure necessary for it to be classified as a protein and is considered a long amino acid chain. These peptides are all soluble in water in their native forms, independent of pH.

Major forms and uses
There a majorly four types of whey protein that are commercially produced:
 Whey Protein Concentrates (WPC) have typically low - though not absent - levels of fat and cholesterol. They also contain carbohydrates in the form of lactose. Powders are typically between 29%–89% protein by dry weight.
 Whey Protein Isolates (WPI) are processed to remove fat and lactose, and as a result, WPI powders are typically over 90% protein by dry weight. Like WPC, WPI are mild and slightly milky in taste.
 Whey Protein Hydrolysates (WPH) are whey proteins that are predigested and partially hydrolyzed for the purpose of easier metabolizing. Their cost is generally higher than WPC or WPI. Highly hydrolysed whey may be less allergenic than other forms of whey, due to its much smaller and simpler peptide chains. For this reason it is a common constituent in hypoallergenic baby milk formulas and medical foods.
 Native whey protein is extracted from skim milk, rather than being collected as a byproduct of cheese production. This type of whey does not contain glycomacropeptide, which is formed only after the addition of rennet.

There is evidence that whey protein is more bio-available than casein or soy protein.

Whey protein is commonly marketed as a dietary supplement, typically sold in powdered form for mixing into beverages. Whey protein is also commonly used as a thickener to improve texture and decrease syneresis in many types of yogurt. Yogurt with high amounts of protein have been more commonly found on shelves due to the recently increasing popularity of Greek Yogurt.

Use for strength training and muscle building 
The primary usage of whey protein supplements is for muscle growth and development. Eating whey protein supplements before exercise will not assist athletic performance, but it will enhance the body's protein recovery and synthesis after exercise because it increases the free amino acids in the body's free amino acid pool. 

In 2010 a panel of the European Food Safety Authority (EFSA) panel examined the effects on whey protein on weight loss (via both fat loss and increased satiety) and strength and muscle building. The panel concluded that there's no evidence supporting any weight loss claims and that whey protein is roughly as effective for building strength, muscle and lean body mass as other protein sources.

Although whey proteins are responsible for some milk allergies, the major allergens in milk are the caseins.

Whey cheese

Whey cheese, such as ricotta, is produced from whey and is rich in whey protein (except for brunost). The whey protein accounts for about 40–45% of the solids content of ricotta.

References

External links
 Whey protein resources, National Dairy Council
 Whey Protein Healthnotes , University of California, San Diego

Bodybuilding supplements
Dietary supplements
Mammalian proteins
Cheese